Eskeri is the Tungus creator god. He retrieved magic mud from the primeval waters and used it to form the Earth.

References

Tungusic mythology
Creator gods